Marcus Aureli, better known by his stage name Circus, is an American rapper based in Los Angeles, California. He is a member of Shape Shifters.

Career
Circus released Gawd Bless the Faceless Cowards, a collaborative album with producer Andre Afram Asmar, on Mush Records in 2004. Allmusic gave the album 3 out of 5 stars, while Exclaim! described it as "a good album that might be Circus's most accessible release to date".

Discography

Albums
 Gangstahz fo Gawd (2002)
 Bootlegs (2003)
 Gawd Bless the Faceless Cowards (2004) with Andre Afram Asmar

Guest appearances
 Omid - "Farmers Market of the Beast" from Beneath the Surface (1998)
 Three Eyed Cowz - "Broken Chain Shifters" from The Evil Cow Burger (1998)
 The Mind Clouders - "Unraveling" from Fake It Until You Make It (1999)
 Greenthink - "Circus Sells Lojak Doortadoor" from Blindfold (1999)
 2Mex - Words Knot Music (2000)
 Daddy Kev - "This Stuff's Really Wacko" from Lost Angels (2001)
 Busdriver & Radioinactive with Daedelus - "Barely Music" from The Weather (2003)

Compilation appearances
 "Holy Shit!" from Music for the Advancement of Hip Hop (2000)

References

External links
 Circus on Mush Records
 

Rappers from Los Angeles
Living people
21st-century American rappers
Year of birth missing (living people)